Platinum Point is a development by Gregor Shore Limited in the Western Harbour area of Newhaven in Edinburgh, Scotland. It formed part of a large scale redevelopment of the Leith docklands by Forth Ports, named Edinburgh Forthside. The development is located near the Ocean Terminal shopping centre.

The eventual development was for 452 flats with 50 different designs available, although only half (Phase 1) has been built owing to the developer, Gregor Shore Limited, entering into administration on 14 October 2008. The company was dissolved on 9 January 2015.

In September 2006 owners of apartments in Phase 1 formed the Platinum Point Owners′ Association.

External links
 Platinum Point Owners′ Association
 Platinum Point Developer's Website
 Gregor Shore Limited
 Forth Ports PLC

Areas of Edinburgh